Maldives Polytechnic is a Maldivian government training institute established to offer technical and vocational education and training throughout the country. It was previously known as VTC, MITE, and then became a Faculty of MCHE and now Maldives Polytechnic under the Ministry of Higher Education.

The decision to establish the institution was made on 9 February 2010 after discussing a paper submitted by Ministry of Education. The polytechnic was established on 12 April 2010 under the authority stated in article 116 of the constitution of Rep. of Maldives.

References

External links 
 

Universities in the Maldives
Malé
Educational institutions established in 2010
2010 establishments in the Maldives